Dana Gilbert (born November 26, 1959) is a former professional tennis player from the United States.

Biography
Gilbert grew up in California, one of three siblings. Her youngest brother is Brad Gilbert, who also played tennis professionally, and made it to four in the world.

She attended Piedmont High School, and then UCLA on a tennis scholarship and played number one singles.

At the age of 17 she won a gold medal at the 1977 Maccabiah Games in Israel, a competition for Israeli and Jewish athletes, defeating Stacy Margolin, the number 8 under-18 player in the U.S. At the 1981 Maccabiah Games, she and Donna Rubin won a gold medal in the women's doubles.

Playing as a wildcard, she was a surprise winner of the 1978 U.S. Clay Court Championships, on her professional debut. En route to the final, which she won over Viviana González, she had a win against second seed Virginia Ruzici, who two-months earlier had won the French Open. In October, 1980 she won her second WTA singles title at Nagoya and also won the Japan Open doubles title in the same month. She made the fourth round of the 1982 French Open as a lucky loser. In early 1983 she was ranked a career best 46 in the world, before retiring from professional tennis at the end of the year.

She now lives in San Anselmo, California and is married to Geoffrey Heinemann.

In 1994 she was inducted into the Southern California Jewish Sports Hall of Fame.

WTA Tour finals

Singles (2-0)

Doubles (1-0)

References

External links
 
 

1959 births
Living people
American female tennis players
Jewish American sportspeople
Jewish tennis players
Competitors at the 1977 Maccabiah Games
Competitors at the 1981 Maccabiah Games
Maccabiah Games gold medalists for the United States
Maccabiah Games medalists in tennis
Tennis people from California
UCLA Bruins women's tennis players
21st-century American Jews
21st-century American women